Taishi Ci (166–206), courtesy name Ziyi, was a Chinese military general who lived during the late Eastern Han dynasty of China. He had served as a minor Han official, before eventually coming to serve warlords Liu Yao, Sun Ce, and Sun Ce's successor Sun Quan.

A native of Donglai Commandery, he started his career as a minor official in the local commandery office. In 186, at the age of 20, he became famous after successfully completing a mission to prevent a letter from the provincial administration from reaching the imperial court in Luoyang first. However, out of fear that the provincial administration would take revenge against him, he went into hiding in Liaodong. After returning from Liaodong, he travelled to Beihai (around present-day Weifang, Shandong) to rescue the warlord Kong Rong, who was besieged by Yellow Turban rebels. By resorting to trickery, he managed to break out of the siege and seek aid from another warlord, Liu Bei. The siege was lifted when Taishi Ci returned to Beihai with reinforcements from Liu Bei. Taishi Ci travelled to Yang Province later to join the warlord Liu Yao, an old acquaintance of his. He fought for Liu Yao in the war between Liu Yao and Sun Ce, once engaging Sun Ce in a one-on-one fight. Following Liu Yao's defeat and death, Taishi Ci headed to Jing County (north of present-day Jing County, Anhui) and tried to establish his own power base there. However, he was eventually defeated and captured by Sun Ce's forces. Touched by Sun Ce's sincerity and generosity towards him, Taishi Ci agreed to serve Sun Ce and even helped to persuade many former followers of Liu Yao to join Sun Ce as well. Sun Ce appointed him as a Commandant and put him in charge of security around Jianchang County (present-day Fengxin County, Jiangxi). During this time, he drove back Liu Pan (劉磐) and his men, who often raided Sun Ce's territories in that area. After Sun Ce's death, Taishi Ci continued serving under Sun Ce's successor, Sun Quan. Sun Quan deeply mourned Taishi Ci when the latter died in 206.

Taishi Ci's biography in the Records of the Three Kingdoms (Sanguozhi) described him as seven chi tall (approximately 178–182 cm) and having a shiny and beautiful beard. He was famous for his archery skills.

Early career in Donglai Commandery
Taishi Ci was from Huang County (黃縣), Donglai Commandery (東萊郡), which is in present-day Longkou, Shandong. As a youth, he was known for being studious. He served as a zoucaoshi (奏曹史; a minor official) in the local commandery office. Around 186, the commandery administration had a dispute with their superiors, the provincial administration of Qing Province. Both sides wrote to the imperial court in the capital Luoyang to complain about each other. At the time, since the imperial court often made decisions on a first-come, first-served basis, it meant that the court would tend to rule in favour of the party whose document it received first. Since the provincial administration had already sent a courier to deliver their complaint letter, the Administrator (太守) of Donglai Commandery began to feel anxious and started looking for someone to help him deliver his letter. Taishi Ci, then 20 years old, was chosen for the task.

When Taishi Ci finally reached Luoyang after travelling day and night, he saw the provincial administration's courier near the city gate. He approached him and asked, "Sir, are you delivering a document?" The courier replied, "Yes." Taishi Ci asked again, "Where is the document?" The courier replied, "In the carriage." Taishi Ci said, "Are you sure there is no mistake in the addressee's details on the document? Let me see it." The courier did not know that Taishi Ci was from Donglai Commandery so he showed him the letter. Taishi Ci took out a knife and destroyed the letter. The courier started shouting, "This man destroyed my document!" Taishi Ci pulled him into the carriage and said, "If you didn't show me the document, I wouldn't have been able to destroy it. Regardless of the consequences, neither of us can say he is not responsible for what happened. I suggest we remain silent and escape. By doing this, we can avoid punishment and keep our heads. Otherwise, both of us will be executed." The courier asked, "Your master sent you to destroy this document. Now that you have accomplished your mission, why do you still need to go on the run?" Taishi Ci replied, "He ordered me to only check whether the document has been delivered. However, I went too far and ended up destroying the document. If I go back, I am afraid that my master will blame me, so I suggest we escape together." The courier was persuaded by Taishi Ci so they fled from Luoyang together.

After leaving Luoyang, Taishi Ci secretly returned later and delivered the commandery administration's letter to the imperial court. When the provincial administration of Qing Province found out, they sent another letter to the central government again. However, as the second letter contained some discrepancies, the imperial court ruled against the provincial administration in the dispute. Taishi Ci became famous after this incident. However, out of fear that the provincial administration would take revenge against him, he fled from Donglai Commandery and took shelter in Liaodong.

Saving Kong Rong from the siege of Duchang
Kong Rong, the Chancellor (相) of Beihai State (北海國; around present-day Weifang, Shandong), heard about Taishi Ci and regarded him as an extraordinary talent. He sent his subordinates to visit Taishi Ci's mother on multiple occasions and passed her many gifts. In the late 180s or early 190s, when Beihai came under attack by Yellow Turban rebels, Kong Rong led his troops to a fortress at Duchang (都昌; in present-day Weifang, Shandong). The rebels, led by Guan Hai (管亥), besieged the Duchang fortress. After Taishi Ci returned from Liaodong, his mother told him, "You haven't met Kong Rong. He treated me very generously – almost like an old friend – while you were away. Now that he is in trouble, you should quickly go to help him." Three days later, Taishi Ci travelled alone on foot to Duchang.

At the time, the rebels had yet to completely surround Duchang, so Taishi Ci managed to sneak past the enemy at night and enter the fortress to meet Kong Rong. He asked Kong Rong to let him lead soldiers to fight their way out, but Kong refused and insisted on waiting for reinforcements. The rebels came closer day by day. Kong Rong wanted to seek help from Liu Bei, the Chancellor of Pingyuan State (平原國), but no one had any idea on how to break out of the siege. Taishi Ci volunteered to fight his way out and seek reinforcements from Liu Bei, but Kong Rong said, "The rebels have completely surrounded the fortress. Everyone thinks it is impossible to break out. It will be very difficult for you to break out no matter how courageous you are." Taishi Ci replied, "When I was away, you treated my mother very generously. She feels grateful, hence she told me to help you. She knew that I know what I am doing, and that I can help you. Now, everyone says it is impossible to break out. If I were to agree with them, I will not be able to repay your kindness. Why, then, did my mother send me here for? We are in a very desperate situation. I hope you won't hesitate any longer." Kong Rong agreed to let him break out of the siege.

Taishi Ci packed his equipment and had a full meal. At dawn, he brought his bow and a quiver of arrows with him, and rode out of the fortress. He was accompanied by two riders, each carrying a target stand for archery practice. When the rebels saw Taishi Ci coming out of the fortress, they immediately readied themselves for battle. To their surprise, Taishi Ci took the two stands, placed them in the ditch around the fortress, fired some arrows at them, and then returned to the fortress. The following day, he repeated the entire process. Some of the rebels stood up and prepared for battle upon seeing him, while others ignored him and remained relaxed. On the third day, when Taishi Ci came out again, the rebels thought that he was going to practise archery again, so they paid no attention to him. Taishi Ci then seized the opportunity to break out of the siege. By the time the rebels realised what was going on, Taishi Ci had already escaped and killed several rebels along the way. None of them dared to pursue him.

When Taishi Ci arrived at Pingyuan, he told Liu Bei, "I, (Taishi) Ci, am a commoner from Donglai. I am neither a relative nor an acquaintance of Kong Rong. But I have heard of him and we not only share similar beliefs, but also experienced difficult times together. Now, Guan Hai and the rebels have besieged Kong Rong; he is desperately in need of help. You are known for your kindness, righteousness, and willingness to help those in need. Kong Rong admires you and has placed his hopes in you, hence he sent me to fight my way out of the siege to seek help from you. Only you can save him." Liu Bei's facial expression turned serious and he said, "So Kong Rong knows that Liu Bei exists in this world!" He then sent 3,000 troops to follow Taishi Ci back to Duchang. When the rebels heard that reinforcements had arrived, they fled and the siege of Duchang was automatically lifted. Kong Rong regarded Taishi Ci even more highly after this event. He told Taishi Ci, "You are a young friend of mine." When Taishi Ci returned home and told his mother about it, she said, "I am very happy that you can repay Kong Rong's kindness in this way."

Coming to serve Sun Ce

Liu Yao, the Inspector (刺史) of Yang Province, was not only also from Donglai Commandery like Taishi Ci, but also an old acquaintance of Taishi Ci. Taishi Ci had not met Liu Yao since his return from Liaodong, so he crossed the Yangtze River and travelled to Qu'e County (曲阿縣; present-day Danyang, Jiangsu) to find Liu Yao. Before he left, the warlord Sun Ce led his forces to attack Liu Yao's territories. Someone advised Liu Yao to appoint Taishi Ci as a general to lead his troops to counter Sun Ce, but Liu Yao said, "If I appoint Taishi Ci, Xu Zijiang will laugh at me." He then sent Taishi Ci on a reconnaissance mission to assess the strength of Sun Ce's forces.

Taishi Ci, accompanied by only a single horseman, encountered Sun Ce at Shen Village (神亭; somewhere in present-day Danyang, Jiangsu) during his mission. Sun Ce had 13 other men with him, including Han Dang, Song Qian and Huang Gai. Taishi Ci rode forth and engaged Sun Ce in battle. Sun Ce thrust his spear at Taishi Ci's horse and managed to grab the handheld ji that Taishi carried on his back. Taishi Ci, on the other hand, managed to get hold of Sun Ce's helmet. Their fight was broken up when their respective subordinates showed up.

After Liu Yao was defeated by Sun Ce subsequently in battle, Taishi Ci originally planned to accompany Liu Yao as he fled to Yuzhang Commandery (豫章郡; around present-day Nanchang, Jiangxi) for shelter. However, Taishi Ci went into hiding in the hills at Wuhu County (蕪湖縣; east of present-day Wuhu, Anhui) and declared himself the Administrator (太守) of Danyang Commandery (丹楊郡). By then, Sun Ce had conquered the territories east of Xuancheng County (宣城縣; present-day Xuancheng, Anhui); only the six counties west of Jing County (涇縣; north of present-day Jing County, Anhui) remained outside of Sun Ce's control. Taishi Ci headed to Jing County, where he established a base and managed to recruit the Shanyue people to join him. Sun Ce personally led his forces to attack Taishi Ci, defeated him in battle, and captured him. Later, he released Taishi Ci from his bonds, held his hand and asked, "Do you still remember our fight at Shen Village? What would you do if you captured me?" Taishi Ci replied, "I can't be certain about this." Sun Ce laughed and said, "I shall manage the present-day affairs of the state together with you from this moment onwards."

Sun Ce asked Taishi Ci, "In the past, you helped your commandery's administrator destroy a letter from the provincial administration, saved Wenju (Kong Rong) from danger, and successfully obtained reinforcements from Xuande (Liu Bei). These are all acts of heroism. You are one of the most intelligent people in this world, yet you haven't found someone who appreciates your talent. The ancients could forget about she gou zhan qu. I am someone who appreciates you. You don't need to worry that you will feel unhappy if you join me." Sun Ce also said, "If a dragon wishes to soar into the sky, it has to take off from a piece of wood."

Alternative account in the Wu Li
The Wu Li (吳歷) provided a different account of how Taishi Ci came to serve Sun Ce. It mentioned that Taishi Ci was defeated and captured by Sun Ce after their fight at Shen Village. Sun Ce had heard of Taishi Ci before so he released Taishi Ci from his bonds and asked him for advice on his future conquests. Taishi Ci replied, "I am an officer of a defeated army. I am not qualified to speak on such matters." Sun Ce said, "In the past, Han Xin heeded advice from Guangwu. In the present, I seek advice from a man of righteousness. What are you talking about?" Taishi Ci replied, "My army has recently been defeated. The troops are scattered and low on morale. It may be difficult, but I still intend to gather and bring them together. I am afraid this is not what you wish to see." Sun Ce knelt down and said, "What I want is your sincerity. I hope you will return by midday tomorrow." When Sun Ce's subordinates raised doubts about Taishi Ci's loyalty, Sun Ce said, "Taishi Ziyi is a famous man from Qing Province. He is known for keeping his promises. I believe he will not deceive me." The following day, Sun Ce hosted a banquet and had a pole erected in the middle, so as to keep track of time by observing its shadow. By midday, when the shadow was shortest, Taishi Ci returned as promised. Sun Ce was overjoyed. He often consulted Taishi Ci on military affairs later on.

Pei Songzhi, who added the Wu Li account as an annotation to Taishi Ci's biography in the Sanguozhi, noted that the Wu Li account deviated significantly from what was recorded in Taishi Ci's Sanguozhi biography. He suspected that there was a mistake.

Persuading Liu Yao's followers to surrender to Sun Ce
After returning to his base in Wu Commandery (around present-day Suzhou, Jiangsu), Sun Ce commissioned Taishi Ci as a "General of the Household Who Breaks Waves" (折衝中郎將). Although Liu Yao had already died in Yuzhang Commandery (豫章郡; around present-day Nanchang, Jiangxi) in 195, there were still thousands of his former followers scattered around the area. Sun Ce sent Taishi Ci to persuade them to surrender.

Sun Ce told Taishi Ci, "In the past, when Liu Yao criticised me for helping Yuan Shu conquer Lujiang, he didn't have good intentions and his reasons were not convincing. Why? Yuan Shu had control over the thousands of troops which used to be under my father's command. I wanted to make great achievements, so I had no choice but to submit to Yuan Shu and ask him to give me control of my father's troops. Even then, he only gave me back about 1,000 men. When he ordered me to attack Lujiang, the circumstances I was in were so desperate that I had no choice but to obey him. Later on, he turned evil and wanted to commit treacherous acts. I tried to dissuade him but he wouldn't listen. That was when I decided to sever ties with him. My relationship with Yuan Shu is only up to this extent. Now that Liu Yao is dead, there is no chance for me to explain to him anymore. However, his son still lives in Yuzhang. I don't know how Hua Ziyu treats him, and whether Liu Yao's former followers have decided to serve Hua Ziyu. You are from the same commandery as Liu Yao, and you served under him before. I hope you can visit his son and convey my wishes to his followers. If they wish to join me, I will welcome them; if they don't, do treat them kindly. At the same time, you can assess how strong Hua Ziyu's defences are, and see if the peoples of Luling and Poyang are willing to join me. You can bring along as many men as you wish." Taishi Ci replied, "I have committed unpardonable acts. Yet, you treat me as generously as how Duke Huan of Qi and Duke Wen of Jin treated former enemies who surrendered to them. The ancients lived by a code of loyalty until death. I don't need too many men to accompany me. Just a dozen or so will be sufficient."

Sun Ce's aides cautioned him, "(Taishi) Ci will not come back if he leaves." However, Sun Ce said, "If Ziyi abandons me, who else can he turn to?" He personally saw Taishi Ci off, held his hand and asked, "When will you return?" Taishi Ci replied, "Not more than 60 days." He kept his word and returned within 60 days.

When Sun Ce sent Taishi Ci to persuade Liu Yao's followers to surrender, many of Sun Ce's aides felt that Taishi Ci could not be trusted. They believed that Taishi Ci would defect to either Hua Xin or Huang Zu. However, Sun Ce said, "All of you are wrong. I trust my judgment. Taishi Ci may be brave and headstrong, but he is not an impulsive person. He is a man of exemplary character and a man who keeps his word. I treat him like a close friend and will not betray him. All of you don't need to worry." Sun Ce's aides only trusted Taishi Ci after he kept his promise and returned from Yuzhang Commandery. When Taishi Ci met Sun Ce again, he said, "Hua Ziyu is a man of virtue, but not a talented leader. He has no grand plan; he only wants to preserve the status quo. Tong Zhi (僮芝) from Danyang lied that he has been appointed as the Administrator of Luling and has taken control of the commandery. The local clans in Poyang have formed their own ruling body and driven away the officials sent by Hua Ziyu to govern the area. Hua Ziyu is unable to control Luling and Poyang. Moreover, about 5,000 to 6,000 local clans in Haihun (海昏) have formed their own ruling body too and rejected control by the commandery administration. Hua Ziyu can do nothing about this." Sun Ce clapped his hands and laughed. Later on, he pacified Yuzhang Commandery and successfully induced Hua Xin to surrender to him.

Service under the Sun family
Liu Pan (劉磐), a nephew of Jing Province's governor Liu Biao, often led his troops to raid Sun Ce's territories in Ai County (艾縣; west of present-day Xiushui County, Jiangxi), Xi'an County (西安縣; present-day Putian District, Wuning County, Jiangxi) and the nearby counties. Sun Ce created a commandery composed of Haihun County (海昏縣; present-day Xiangshan Town, Xinjian District, Nanchang, Jiangxi), Jianchang County (建昌縣; present-day Fengxin County, Jiangxi) and six other counties, and appointed Taishi Ci as its Commandant (都尉), with the administrative centre at Haihun County. Taishi Ci led troops from these counties to drive back Liu Pan. Liu Pan stopped his raids after that.

Taishi Ci was famous for his archery skills. There was one notable incident when he accompanied Sun Ce to attack rebels in Mabao (麻保). The rebel leader stood at the viewing platform above the gate, with his hand resting against a wooden pillar, and hurled verbal abuse at Sun Ce. Taishi Ci took aim and fired an arrow at him. The arrow pierced through both the pillar and the rebel's hand. Everyone was awed by Taishi Ci's skill. When the warlord Cao Cao heard about Taishi Ci, he wrote a letter to him and put it inside a box containing a few pieces of danggui.

Sun Ce died in 200 CE and was succeeded by his younger brother, Sun Quan. When Sun Quan came to power, he continued to put Taishi Ci in charge of security in the areas around Haihun County because he knew that Taishi Ci was capable of deterring Liu Pan.

Death
Taishi Ci died in 206 at the age of 41 (by East Asian age reckoning). Before his death, he sighed and said, "A man living in this world should aspire to carry a seven chi-long sword and rise to the position of a Son of Heaven. Now, I have yet to realise my ambition. How unfortunate that I am going to die soon!" Sun Quan deeply mourned Taishi Ci's death.

Family
Taishi Ci had a son, Taishi Xiang (太史享), whose courtesy name was "Yuanfu" (元復). Taishi Xiang served in Eastern Wu and held the appointments of Colonel of Yue Cavalry (越騎校尉), Imperial Secretary (尚書), and Administrator (太守) of Wu Commandery.

Appraisal
Chen Shou, who wrote Taishi Ci's biography in the Sanguozhi, commented on Taishi Ci as follows: "Taishi Ci was loyal, righteous, trustworthy and upright. He possessed traits of ancient sages."

In Romance of the Three Kingdoms
Taishi Ci appears as a character in the 14th century historical novel Romance of the Three Kingdoms by Luo Guanzhong. His death was exaggerated for dramatic effect in Chapter 53 of the novel. See Battle of Hefei (208)#In fiction for details.

In popular culture

Taishi Ci is featured as a playable character in the video game series Romance of the Three Kingdoms, Dynasty Warriors and Warriors Orochi by Koei.

Taishi Ci appears in the 2007 anime Kōtetsu Sangokushi, which is loosely based on Romance of the Three Kingdoms, as a general of the "barbaric" Go (Wu) faction. The character Taishiji Shigi of the anime series Ikki Tousen is also based roughly on Taishi Ci.

See also
 Lists of people of the Three Kingdoms

Notes

References
Citations from Sanguozhi

 Chen, Shou (3rd century). Records of the Three Kingdoms (Sanguozhi).
Citations from Sanguozhi zhu

 Pei, Songzhi (5th century). Annotations to Records of the Three Kingdoms (Sanguozhi zhu).
Citations from other sources

 
 Sima, Guang (1084). Zizhi Tongjian.

166 births
206 deaths
Chinese duellists
Generals under Sun Quan
Han dynasty generals from Shandong
Liu Yao and associates
People from Yantai
Sun Ce and associates